Kundurpi is a village in Anantapur district of the Indian state of Andhra Pradesh. It is the headquarters of Kundurpi mandal in Kalyandurg revenue division.

Demographics 
According to Indian census, 2001, the demographic details of Kundurpi mandal is as follows:
 Total Population: 	48,205	in 9,334 Households.
 Male Population: 	24,699	and Female Population: 	23,506
 Children Under 6-years of age: 7,226	(Boys – 3,675 and Girls -	3,551)
 Total Literates: 	21,258

References 

Historical Temples: Kota Lashmi Narasimha swamy Temple, Sri Ramalayam Temple, Sri Venkateswara Swamy Temple, Dharg.

Villages in Anantapur district
Mandal headquarters in Anantapur district